The list of people from Greater Manchester, in North West England, is divided by metropolitan borough. The demonym of Greater Manchester is "Greater Mancunian":

References

Bibliography